Valdemar “Val” A. Jens Andersen  (born on 21 March 1919 in Palmerston North) was a British Colonial Service administrator from New Zealand.

He was educated at Napier Boys' High School and Auckland University College. He was then appointed as a cadet in the British Solomon Islands Protectorate.
He served as Lieutenant in command with the Royal Navy during World War II (1940-1946). In 1947, he joined the Colonial Service for the Gilbert and Ellice Islands as an Administrative Officer Cadet, where he remained until been appointed in 1962 as Resident Commissioner.

References

1919 births
2004 deaths
Colonial Administrative Service officers
Governors of the Gilbert and Ellice Islands
People from former British colonies and protectorates in Oceania
New Zealand expatriates in Kiribati